Zhilino is a rural locality (a village) in Mezzhenskoye Rural Settlement, Ustyuzhensky District, Vologda Oblast, Russia. The population was 20 as of 2002.

Geography 
Dolotskoye is the nearest rural locality.

References 

Rural localities in Ustyuzhensky District